Henry Hsu  (6 December 1912 – 3 February 2009) was a Taiwanese athlete and politician.

Hsu was born in Hua County and had planned to follow his parents into the medical field, until his mother's death in a hotel fire when Hsu was eighteen. Upon graduation from Whampoa Military Academy, Hsu pursued legal studies in Shanghai. He represented the Republic of China at the 1930 and 1934 Far Eastern Championship Games, as a volleyball player and footballer, respectively. Hsu also competed as a swimmer and water polo player. During World War II, Hsu served in the Republic of China Navy. At the time of the Battle of Hong Kong, he was a Lieutenant-Commander and aide-de-camp to Admiral Chan Chak. Hsu played a key role in saving Admiral Chan's life during a dramatic breakout in five small torpedo boats on Christmas Day 1941, which saved a total of sixty eight British, Chinese and Danish intelligence, naval and marine personnel from the Japanese occupation of Hong Kong; for this feat he was made an Honorary Officer of the Order of the British Empire in 1942. Hsu retired from duty with the rank of Rear Admiral. He then owned hotels in Hong Kong, soon expanding operations to Taiwan when he moved there in 1982, and later to the United States in 1992.

He was a member of the International Olympic Committee from 1970 to 1988, and led the Republic of China Olympic Committee from 1973 to 1974. Hsu was first appointed to the Legislative Yuan in 1972 and served until 1987. Upon stepping down from the legislature, he was named a national policy adviser to President Chiang Ching-kuo, and also served Chiang's successor Lee Teng-hui until 2000. Alongside his position as an adviser, Hsu served a nearly concurrent term as president of the Red Cross Society of the Republic of China from 1988 to 2000.

He died of heart failure at the age of 96 in 2009, while being treated for uremia and pneumonia at Taipei Veterans General Hospital. His funeral was held on 16 March, with Ma Ying-jeou, Liu Chao-shiuan, Wang Jin-pyng, Wu Ching-kuo, and Chi Cheng in attendance.

References

External links

1912 births
2009 deaths
Taiwanese sportsperson-politicians
Kuomintang Members of the Legislative Yuan in Taiwan
Members of the 1st Legislative Yuan in Taiwan
Chinese male water polo players
Chinese men's volleyball players
Footballers from Guangzhou
Republic of China politicians from Guangdong
Taiwanese people from Guangdong
Swimmers from Guangzhou
Republic of China Navy officers
Honorary Officers of the Order of the British Empire
Senior Advisors to President Chiang Ching-kuo
Senior Advisors to President Lee Teng-hui
Chinese military personnel of World War II
Whampoa Military Academy alumni
Taiwanese hoteliers
Red Cross personnel
20th-century Taiwanese businesspeople 
21st-century Taiwanese businesspeople
Association footballers not categorized by position
Taiwanese footballers
Politicians from Guangzhou
Volleyball players from Guangdong
People from Huadu District